"Can't Stop Dancin" is a song written by John Pritchard Jr. and Ray Stevens, which became a Top 40 hit for Captain and Tennille in early 1977. It was the first single released from their third studio album, Come In from the Rain.

The lyrics speak of music as being reflective of the "rhythm of the universe". Dancing is the best way to respond to that rhythm, indicating the need for resilience in order to adjust to the vicissitudes of life.

Record World said it "has a gospel/rock flavor with Toni's vocal and Daryl's keyboards making a strong case for yet another hit."

Chart performance
"Can't Stop Dancin'" reached number 13 on the US Billboard Hot 100 chart and number 11 in Canada on the RPM Top singles chart.	 It charted slightly higher on the Adult Contemporary charts of both nations. It became their first single (excluding "Por Amor Viviremos"—the Spanish version of "Love Will Keep us Together") to miss the top 10 on the Billboard Hot 100, and the duo's first single not to earn a gold record. "Can't Stop Dancin'" marked a decline in the fortunes of The Captain and Tennille as the duo's next three singles ("Come in from the Rain", "Circles", and "I'm on my Way") all missed the top 40 entirely—the duo did return to the top 10 later in 1978 with "You Never Done It Like That".

Weekly charts

Year-end charts

Popular culture
In 1980, Toni Tennille performed "Can't Stop Dancin'" on her talk show, The Toni Tennille Show.

References

External links
 Lyrics of this song
 

1977 songs
1977 singles
Captain & Tennille songs
Songs written by Ray Stevens
A&M Records singles
Songs about dancing